Tease may refer to:
 Teasing
 Tease (EP) by Piano Overlord
 Tease (TV series), a U.S. TV series presented by Lisa Rinna
 Tease (band), an American R&B band from Los Angeles formed in 1979.

See also
 Teaser (disambiguation)
 Teaser (gambling)